File or filing may refer to:

Mechanical tools and processes
 File (tool), a tool used to remove fine amounts of material from a workpiece
Filing (metalworking), a material removal process in manufacturing
 Nail file, a tool used to gently abrade away and shape the edges of fingernails and toenails

Documents
 An arranged collection of documents
Filing (legal), submitting a document to the clerk of a court

Computing
 Computer file, a resource for storing information
 file URI scheme
  (command), a Unix program for determining the type of data contained in a computer file
File system, a method of storing and organizing computer files and their data
Files by Google, an Android app
Files (Apple), an Apple app

Other uses
 File (formation), a single column of troops one in front of the other
 File (chess), a column of the chessboard
 Filé powder, a culinary ingredient used in Cajun and Creole cooking
 Filé (band), a Cajun musical ensemble from Louisiana, U.S
 Filè, a class of Irish poets
 Electronic Language International Festival, an art and technology festival held yearly in São Paulo, Brazil

See also
 Jake Files (born 1972), a member of the Arkansas State Senate
 File folder, a folder for holding loose papers
 Filing cabinet or file cabinet